Varavoor, a lush green residential village in Thrissur district is in the state of Kerala, India.
It is widely believed that this village was situated on the banks of Bharathapuzha during prehistoric times. Shrinking of the river over several millennia of human settlements has moved the village more distant from its banks. It is surrounded by small green hills and is 30 mins drive away from the cultural capital of Kerala. Varavoor was declared "litigation-free" village on 7 May 2000.
Climatic conditions in and around Varavoor varies around the year. The well-known Palakkal Pooram is usually held in the month of February welcoming tourists from different parts of the country. During the month of February, paddy fields surrounding the Palakkal temple is usually fallow after harvest, making it ideal location for gathering for the pooram festivities and for fireworks at night.

Flora and Fauna
Varavoor is home to a wide variety of flora and fauna. Several herbs and plant species are found in small patches around the place. Main occupation of the people used to be agriculture. Many youngsters had relocated to cities looking for a white collar job in the past and agriculture has since taken a backseat, like elsewhere in the state. Once lush green paddy fields are now dry barren pieces of land. Animals mainly include domestic livestock and cattle. Small animals like mongoose, porcupine, squirrels etc. were once in abundance. When the habitat of animals like snakes, peacocks, foxes, monkeys, deer and boars were disturbed, they took on to the remaining paddy fields and rubber plantations. Now many of these animals are sighted regularly in the fields and bushes. Depletion of water bodies have driven away many species of birds which used to flock in and roost in the locality.

Demographics
 India census, Varavoor had a population of 7643 with 3617 males and 4026 females.

Geology
Outskirts of Varavoor were found to be the epicenter of tremors and relatively strong quakes reported in the district. A Siesmometer has also been installed in the locality to record these tremors.

Culture and Religion
This village was a part of Chera Kingdom once and was later invaded by Tipu Sultan. Chera kings were ardent Shaivas and the legend says that they had built 108 Shiva temples in the neighborhood. Almost all these temples were lost in the ebb of time. Thanks to Archaeological Survey of India, we can still experience the ancient temple architecture in Thirumathaliyappan temple, preserved intact. The villagers have also resurrected some Shivalingas from ruins and one such Shivalinga worshipped in Keezhthali Mahadeva Temple stands tall as one of the biggest In India.

Remnants of ancient homes and burial urns were also discovered and excavated not very far from the locality.
The village is now religiously and culturally rich with Hinduism, Islam and Christianity in practice. A dilapidated shrine, believed to be that of a Jain temple, is also found at a distance of 15 Km from here, approx.

Churches

Our Lady of Divine Love Church Varavoor

Temples

Cheloor Sri Devi Chira Anthimahakalankavu
Varavur Palakkal Bhagawathy Temple
Keezhthali Sree Mahadeva Temple
Ramankulangara Ayyappan Kavu Temple
Moorkkan Kulangara Sree Mahadeva Temple
Methrukkovil Kottaram Shiva Temple
Thali Nedumbrayur Thirumuthaliyappan Temple
Sree Viruttanam Bhagavathy temple
Madapathi Ayyappan kovil

Mosques

Thali Mosque
Thaqwa Masjid Thali
Mohiyuddin Masjid Naduvattam
Varavoor Makham Sherief (Valavu)
Kumarappanal Mosque
Kottupuram Mosque

Transport

Varavoor is well connected by road and rail. Roads that connect to Varavoor unfurls through beautiful landscapes and vegetation.

Road

From State Highway 22  (Thrissur - Shornoor high way SH22) Varavoor is just 10 minutes drive, i.e. around 7 km. One needs to turn from Mullukara  (SH22) and take Chittanda Thalasseri Road. Varavoor is 5 km from State Highway 50 (Kunnamkulam Road). One can also reach Varavoor from SH39 (Cheruthuruthi - Perumpilavu Rd). It is around 3 km from State Highway 39.

Rail

 Mullurkara railway station - 7 km away
 Vallathol Nagar railway station - 8 km away
 Wadakkanchery railway station - 11 km away
 Shoranur Junction railway station - 13 km away
 Thrissur railway station - 25  km away

Air

Cochin International Airport - 78 km
Calicut International Airport - 78 km

Landmarks
The world-famous Kerala Kalamandalam is just 20 min drive from here.

The popular landmark in Varavoor is the Varavoor Valavu junction
Varavoor Valavu Junction

Post Office

The Varavoor Post Office is situated on the Chittanda-Thallasery Road. It is just 400 meters from the Panchayat office and 600 metres for Varavoor Valavu Junction
Varavoor Post Office

Educational Institutions

Schools

Government Lower Primary School, Varavoor.
Government Higher Secondary School, Varavoor
ANMM UP school, Thali
Rose Garden English School, Thali
St. Joseph School Kudannur
Kanjirakode LP School

Higher Education
 Vakil P Kumaran Ezhuthachan College (http://vpkezhuthachancollege.com/) Founded with the mission of uplifting the needy and a true merge of Excellence & Upliftment .
VAKIL P KUMARAN EZHUTHACHAN COLLEGE
Vakil P Kumaran Ezhuthachan College is a self financing Arts and Science College affiliated to the University of Calicut and sanctioned by Govt.Of Kerala and promoted by Ezhuthachan Educational Society for Human Resources Development, Thrissur-4. Vakil P Kumaran Ezhuthachan was a Social reformer who fought relentlessly for the upliftment of socially and educationally backward people. He was an activist and was in the forefront of freedom struggle and agrarian movement as a popular leader. He was elected five times to the Cochin Legislative Council before India’s Independence
The College is located in 5 acre Campus at Varavoor near Wadakkanchery in Thrissur. Catering mainly to the higher educational needs of socially and economically backward people of this area.

courses offered :
BA English , BCom. Finance & BCom Cooperation.

Contact Us
Varavoor, Wadakkanchery, Thrissur, 680585

Malabar College of Engineering and Technology (15 min from Varavoor)
Malabar College of Engineering and Technology is promoted by the IQRA Educational and Charitable Trust. The IQRA Educational and Charitable Trust have dedicated itself to the cause of knowledge and empowerment, with special focus, on technical education for the educationally, socially and economically backward communities. In the light of this, MCET is established in 2009 by an order of the Government of Kerala, approved by AICTE New Delhi and affiliated to Calicut University.

Jyothi Engineering College (30 min drive from Varavoor)
Jyothi Engineering College, Cheruthuruthy, Thrissur (JECC), run under the aegis of the Trichur Educational Trust, which in turn is a part of the Archdiocese of Trichur, is a centre for higher education in the field of engineering, in the state of Kerala, India. It is an AICTE approved institution and is affiliated to the University of Calicut. The college was started in the year 2002.

Kerala Kalamandalam Deemed University for Art and Culture (25 min drive from Varavoor)
Kerala Kalamandalam (Malayalam: കേരള കലാമണ്ഡലം), lately renamed as Kalamandalam Deemed University of Art and Culture, is a major centre for learning Indian performing arts, especially those that developed in the southern state of Kerala. It is situated in the village of Cheruthuruthy in Thrissur District on the banks of the Bharathapuzha river. The institution, now a deemed university, was founded in 1930 by poet Vallathol Narayana Menon and Manakkulam Mukunda Raja. Kalamandalam imparts training in classical dance and theatre forms like Kathakali, Mohiniyattam, Kudiyattam, Thullal, Kuchipudi, Bharatanatyam, and Nangiar Koothu, besides the traditional orchestra called Panchavadyam. Training is also given in various percussion instruments like chenda, maddalam and mizhavu. Kalamandalam follows the gurukula sampradayam, the ancient Indian education system based on residential tutelage. Kalamandalam was conceived to provide training to its students in the Gurukula Sampradaya, an ancient tradition of residential schooling where students stayed with the teachers, sharing the same atmosphere and learning from them the nuances of the arts. Eminent masters were brought to Kalamandalam. Training sessions, which started in the morning, extended till late in the night.

Government Medical College, Thrissur (45 min drive from Varavoor)
Vidya Academy of Science and Technology (30 min drive from Varavoor)

Banks
Kerala Gramin Bank, Varavoor 

CATHOLIC SYRIAN BANK LTD, MULLURKARA
IFSC CODE : csbk0000173.
MICR CODE : non-micr.

CANARA BANK, WADAKKANCHERRY
IFSC CODE : cnrb0000723.
MICR CODE : 680015402.

SOUTH INDIAN BANK, WADAKKANCHERRY
IFSC CODE : sibl0000095.
MICR CODE : 680059402.

STATE BANK OF INDIA, WADAKKANCHERRY
IFSC CODE : SBIN0070172.
MICR CODE : Waiting.

References

External links

Villages in Thrissur district